Alpine skiing was inducted at the Youth Olympic Games at the inaugural edition in 2012.

Medal summaries

Boys' events

Slalom

Giant slalom

Super-G

Alpine combined

Girls' events

Slalom

Giant slalom

Super-G

Alpine combined

Mixed events

Parallel team event

Medal table
As of the 2016 Winter Youth Olympics.

See also
 Alpine skiing at the Winter Olympics
 Alpine skiing at the Winter Paralympics

References

External links
Youth Olympic Games

 
Youth Olympics
Sports at the Winter Youth Olympics